Žilina Airport  is an international public airport located in Žilina, Slovakia. Located near the village of Dolný Hričov, the airport is situated approximately 15 km from the city centre of Žilina and 12 km from the city's railway station. The airport is largely used for international and domestic flights, but caters to private, amateur sport and air ambulance flights. Žilina airport often serves as a primary training airport for students at the University of Žilina majoring in air transport-related studies.

History
The airport was built in the 1970s to replace the old Brezovský Majer airport, to give way to the growing city of Žilina. The first flight to Prague was done on 4 May 1972, and the airport was officially opened on 2 August 1974.

Airlines and Destinations
As of February 2022, there are no scheduled passenger services to/from Žilina Airport.

Statistics

References

External links
Žilina Airport

Airports in Slovakia